Gabriele Fiamma or Gabriello Fiamma (1533–1585) was a Roman Catholic prelate who served as Bishop of Chioggia (1584–1585).

Biography
Marco Medici was born in 1533 and ordained a priest in the Canons Regular of Saint Augustine. On 23 January 1584, he was appointed during the papacy of Pope Gregory XIII as Bishop of Chioggia. He served as Bishop of Chioggia until his death on 14 July 1585.

References

External links and additional sources
 (for Chronology of Bishops) 
 (for Chronology of Bishops) 

16th-century Italian Roman Catholic bishops
Bishops appointed by Pope Gregory XIII
1533 births
1585 deaths
Canonical Augustinian bishops